>pcplayer is a video games magazine, mainly covering PC games, based in Denmark. The first issue was released in 1995. The magazine is now issued under name Gameplay.

History
The first issue of >pcplayer (PC Player at the time) was released in 1995 by publishing house T&T Media. The amount of pages was somewhat smaller than it is today. During a few years in the late 1990s a translated version was published in Sweden. In January 2000 the magazine was bought by publisher Egmont.

In April 2001 the magazine went through a major redesign, the number of pages was drastically increased, the layout was changed and the logo and name changed. About the same time the magazine's website was closed and an online deal was made with Danish gaming website Gamereactor.

It quickly became apparent that Egmont's relaunch of the magazine was a failure, and >pcplayer had to close down in October 2001. The writers did not give up though, a couple of months later a new kind of >pcplayer was launched, now with its own publishing house, Mazafaka Media. Compared to the days with Egmont the page-number was reduced, but other than that it looked like it used to. At the same time a new website was launched.

Four years later, in the beginning of 2006, a deal was made with Jubii A/S, the biggest web portal in Denmark. >pcplayer was responsible for managing the website's gaming section. 1 January 2007 the deal ended and the magazine moved back to its old website.

Format
As a standard, it is approx. 80-100 pages long. News articles, previews, features, interviews and the like are located at the front, with the review section following. After the reviews there is an online and 'Hardware & Gadgets' section. The section for readers' letters follows, at the end of the magazine.

Even though it is a pc-format magazine, a small number of significant games on the Xbox 360 and PlayStation 3 platforms are reviewed.

See also
List of magazines in Denmark

External links
 

1995 establishments in Denmark
Danish-language magazines
Magazines established in 1995
Magazines published in Copenhagen
Monthly magazines published in Denmark
Video game magazines published in Denmark